Kentucky Equality Federation v. Beshear (also known as Kentucky Equality Federation v. Commonwealth of Kentucky) is an American state-level court case started on September 10, 2013 in which the Kentucky Equality Federation sued the Commonwealth of Kentucky in Franklin Circuit Court claiming Kentucky's 2004 constitutional amendment banning same-sex marriage violated sections of the commonwealth's constitution.  Case # 13-CI-1074 was assigned by the Franklin County Court Clerk (the location of the Kentucky State Capitol). The lawsuit was conceived by President Jordan Palmer, written and signed by Vice President of Legal Jillian Hall, Esq.  Jordan Palmer stated to the media that:

Ruling
On April 16, 2015, Kentucky Equality Federation v. Beshear was ruled on by Franklin County Circuit Court Judge Thomas D. Wingate. Judge Wingate sided with Kentucky Equality Federation against the Commonwealth and struck down Kentucky Constitutional Amendment banning same-sex marriages. At the request of Governor Steve Beshear's legal representation, the Judge also placed a stay on the order pending a ruling from a Kentucky appellate court (such as the Kentucky Court of Appeals or Kentucky's court of last resort, the Kentucky Supreme Court) or the U.S. Supreme Court. The lawsuit was a significant victory for the Kentucky Equality Federation and the same-sex marriage civil rights movement.

See also
 LGBT rights in Kentucky
 Same-sex marriage in Kentucky
 Same-sex marriage in the United States
 Matthew Shepard
 Westboro Baptist Church

References

Kentucky state case law
United States same-sex union case law
LGBT in Kentucky
2014 in United States case law
2014 in Kentucky
Law articles needing an infobox